The 2003–04 Mid-American Conference women's basketball season began with practices in October 2003, followed by the start of the 2002–03 NCAA Division I women's basketball season in November. Conference play began in January 2004 and concluded in March 2004. Miami won the regular season title with a record of 13–2. Casey Rost of Western Michigan was MAC player of the year.

Second seeded Eastern Michigan won the MAC tournament over seventh seeded Bowling Green. Ryan Coleman of Eastern Michigan was the tournament MVP. Eastern Michigan lost to Kentucky in the first round of the NCAA tournament. Miami, Kent State, and Western Michigan played in the WNIT.

Preseason Awards 
The preseason poll was announced by the league office on October 22, 2003.

Preseason women's basketball poll

East Division 
Kent State

West Division 
Western Michigan

Honors

Postseason

Mid–American Tournament

NCAA Tournament

Women's National Invitational Tournament

Postseason Awards 

Coach of the Year: Maria Fantanarosa, Miami
Player of the Year: Casey Rost, Western Michigan
Freshman of the Year: Ali Mann, Bowling Green
Defensive Player of the Year: Lindsay Austin, Bowling Green
Sixth Man of the Year: Sarah VanMetre, Eastern Michigan

Honors

See also
2003–04 Mid-American Conference men's basketball season

References